United Nations Security Council resolution 606 was adopted unanimously on 23 December 1987, after recalling Resolution 602 (1987) and noting the Secretary-General's report authorised by that resolution. The Council condemned South Africa for its continued occupation of southern parts of the People's Republic of Angola and for its delay in withdrawing its forces from the area.

The Council then requested the Secretary-General to continue monitoring the total withdrawal, with a view to obtaining a full-time frame from South Africa. It also requested him to report back at the earliest date regarding the withdrawal.

The draft Resolution 606 was submitted by Argentina, the Congo, Ghana, the United Arab Emirates and Zambia. The representative from Angola present said that while South Africa was announcing its withdrawal, it was, in fact, reinforcing its positions, while the South African Defence Force said it could not provide a timetable.

See also
 Angola – South Africa relations
 List of United Nations Security Council Resolutions 601 to 700 (1987–1991)
 Namibian War of Independence
 South Africa Border Wars
 South Africa under apartheid

References

External links
 
Text of the Resolution at undocs.org

 0606
20th century in South Africa
1987 in South Africa
1987 in Africa
1987 in Angola
 0606
Angola–South Africa relations
December 1987 events